Dashtak is a city in the Central District of Ardal County, Chaharmahal and Bakhtiari province, Iran. At the 2006 census, its population was 4,142 in 898 households, when it was a village in Poshtkuh Rural District. The following census in 2011 counted 4,348 people in 1,092 households. The latest census in 2016 showed a population of 4,016 people in 1,110 households, by which time the village had been elevated to the status of a city. The city is populated by Lurs.

References 

Ardal County

Cities in Chaharmahal and Bakhtiari Province

Populated places in Chaharmahal and Bakhtiari Province

Populated places in Ardal County

Luri settlements in Chaharmahal and Bakhtiari Province